First Flights was a half-hour televised aviation history documentary series. The series premiered on September 25, 1991, on A&E Networks and ran for three seasons. It was hosted by former test pilot and astronaut Neil Armstrong, the first person to walk on the Moon.

The series initially aired Wednesdays at 9 p.m. on A&E in the U.S. The series focused on the technological history of aviation, from early balloons and gliders through war-time and mass commercial aviation, to experimental hypersonic flight at the edge of space.  In the series, Neil Armstrong interviewed pilots and aerospace engineers. Archival footage and vintage aircraft were used to recreate historic takeoffs.

Episodes
Episodes of First Flights with Neil Armstrong are listed below in the original A&E Networks broadcast order.  Season 1 traces the development of aviation technology from balloons to early post-WWII jet aircraft. Season 2 continues the story of atmospheric flight to the edge of space in the 1990s. Neil Armstrong had previously flown several aircraft featured in Season 2 during his long career as a NASA experimental test pilot in Edwards, CA. Season 3 focuses on the development of particular technologies within the broader field of aviation.

Season 1

Season 2

Season 3

Production
During pre-production, the series was titled Test Pilot and the actor Cliff Robertson, who had portrayed the astronaut Buzz Aldrin in Return to Earth, was cast to host the show. Robertson backed out after the filming of flying sequences and pilot interviews had begun in England, the Netherlands, and the United States. A&E agreed to allow the host to be changed, "as long as it was someone of at least the stature of Cliff Robertson." The show's producer obtained a list of astronauts and pilots from the Society of Experimental Test Pilots, and being "naive enough to ... start at the top," approached Armstrong, asking if he would be interested. "The fact that [the show's producer] ran his company out of a small Pennsylvania town and not New York or L.A. may have appealed to the wary Armstrong," Michael Cascio, who supervised the show at A&E, later recalled; Armstrong accepted. Amstrong disapproved of the show's title and, after considering other possibilities, including Thumbs Up!, the producers settled on First Flights.

When the show premiered in the fall of 1991, a television reviewer criticized Armstrong's limited involvement onscreen, and Armstrong agreed to a larger role, conducting discussions with pilots and historians, and flying the aircraft.

Release
The series aired during prime time on A&E until 1993. After subsequently running on the History Channel, First Flights was syndicated to PBS stations across the United States and Canada. The series also appeared on Bridges TV. The series has been broadcast globally, including in the United Kingdom on Discovery Europe, the Netherlands on Evangelische Omroep, and various channels throughout the Middle East and North Africa. Columbia House and A&E Home Video marketed selected episodes on VHS. The complete series has been released by Amazon, where it is available to customers with an Amazon Prime subscription.

Reception
Reviews for pre-released "advanced look" episodes were mixed.  Jay Sharbutt, the senior television writer for The Associated Press, called the series "disappointing" because it did not give enough time to Armstrong. Reviews of subsequent episodes and the second season were positive. Brian Taves (fr) described the series as "an exemplary history of aviation. ...The selection and use of the historical footage is ideal and edited with unusual skill." "The show was an immersive experience with Armstrong looking at — and ultimately trying out — historic aircraft that were risky to fly," Michael Cascio, who supervised the show at A&E, later wrote. "It had the same appeal, in a milder form, as later docureality shows [and]  helped establish and embellish a programming template that populated Discovery, History and National Geographic in the years to come."

References

Further reading

 "Cable premiere". The Deseret News. August 13, 1991.

External links
 
 

1991 American television series debuts
1993 American television series endings
A&E (TV network) original programming
1990s American documentary television series
Documentary television series about aviation
Neil Armstrong